Kelly Errin Herndon (born November 3, 1976) is a former American football cornerback. He was originally signed by the San Francisco 49ers as an undrafted free agent in 1999. He played college football at Toledo. Although he entered his first NFL camp in 1999, Herndon waited until 2002 to play in his first NFL game.  The wait included two training camps with the San Francisco 49ers, one with the New York Giants, one season in the XFL, a spring in Barcelona with NFL Europe and one season serving on the Giants’ and Denver Broncos practice squads.

Herndon has been a member of the Las Vegas Outlaws, Barcelona Dragons, New York Giants, Denver Broncos, Seattle Seahawks and Tennessee Titans in his career.

Early years
Herndon graduated from Chamberlin High School in Twinsburg, Ohio.

Professional career
His most notable performance was in Super Bowl XL playing for the Seattle Seahawks, Herndon intercepted a Ben Roethlisberger pass, returning it 76 yards, establishing a new Super Bowl record.  The record was subsequently broken by James Harrison.

Personal
In Twinsburg, Ohio (population approx. 17,000), a small town about 45 minutes from Cleveland, there is a sign that reads, "Home of NFL Player Kelly Herndon."  The sign was erected in 2004.
Was a classmate and teammate on Chamberlin High School's basketball team with James Posey of the New Orleans Hornets.
Was a defensive back on the XFL's Las Vegas Outlaws in 2001 during the league's one and only season.
Girlfriend gave birth to his sons, KJ in June 2006 and Kyson in 2010.

External links
Denver Broncos bio
Las Vegas Outlaws Bio

1976 births
Living people
People from Twinsburg, Ohio
American football cornerbacks
Toledo Rockets football players
San Francisco 49ers players
Barcelona Dragons players
New York Giants players
Denver Broncos players
Seattle Seahawks players
Tennessee Titans players
Las Vegas Outlaws (XFL) players